Ballymoney was a local government district with borough status in Northern Ireland. It was headquartered in Ballymoney. Other towns in the borough included Dervock, Dunloy, Cloughmills and Rasharkin. The borough had a population of 31,224 according to the 2011 census.

In May 2015 it was merged with the boroughs of Coleraine and Limavady and the District of Moyle to form the Causeway Coast and Glens district.

Creation
Ballymoney was one of twenty-six districts created on 1 October 1973. It took over the areas Ballymoney Urban District Council and most of the surrounding Ballymoney Rural District in County Antrim.

Borough council
The borough was divided into three electoral areas which between them returned 16 members. These were Ballymoney Town (5), Bann Valley (6) and Bushvale (5). Elections were conducted under the proportional representation single transferable vote system, and elections of the whole council were normally held every four years. The election due to take place in May 2009 was postponed in anticipation of the creation of eleven new councils in 2011. The proposed reforms were abandoned in 2010, and the most recent district council elections took place in 2011

As of February 2012 the political composition of the last council was: 8 Democratic Unionist Party (DUP), 3 Sinn Féin, 2 Ulster Unionist Party (UUP), 1 Social Democratic and Labour Party (SDLP), 1 Traditional Unionist Voice and 1 independent.

In 1977 Ballymoney District Council successfully petitioned for a grant of a charter of incorporation, constituting the district a borough.

Mayor of Ballymoney
The charter also created the office of mayor, who was chosen for a one-year term at the council's annual meeting.

Source: Freedom of Information request to Ballymoney Borough Council

Freedom of the Borough
On 22 February 1997 The Ballymoney Branch of the Royal British Legion was awarded the Freedom of the Borough.
In 2012 the Royal Irish Regiment and 152 (Ulster) Transport Regiment, The Royal Logistic Corps (Volunteers) were awarded the freedom of Ballymoney by the council. On both occasions the regiments held special marches through the town to celebrate the awards. Previous recipients of the award include the Royal Ulster Constabulary (Both Regular and Reserve Forces), Northern Ireland Fire Brigade, Joey Dunlop, his brother Robert and former MP for the area Ian Paisley.

Town twinning
In 2000, Ballymoney Borough Council twinned with the French town of Vanves. Since 2001, the council has been a sister city of Benbrook in Texas and building on its motorcycling history, is also linked to the borough of Douglas, Isle of Man.

Parliamentary and assembly representation
Together with the neighbouring districts of Ballymena and Moyle, it forms the North Antrim constituency for elections to the Westminster Parliament and Northern Ireland Assembly.

Former Councillors that went on to become MLAs included Philip McGuigan Mervyn Storey and Daithi McKay.

Demographics
The borough has the highest life expectancy of any area in Northern Ireland, with the average male life expectancy at birth being 79.0 years and 82.6 years for females.

See also
Local Councils in Northern Ireland

References

External links
Ballymoney Borough Council

Politics of County Antrim
Districts of Northern Ireland, 1972–2015
Boroughs of Northern Ireland
borough